I Am Somebody is a 2015 drama film written and directed by Derek Yee about extras working at the Hengdian World Studios. A Chinese-Hong Kong co-production, the film was released in China on July 3, 2015.

Cast
Wan Guopeng as Peng
Wang Ting as Ting
Lin Chen
Xu Xiaoqin as Xiaoqin
Shen Kai as Kai
Hao Yifan
Hao Yifei
Tan Peijun
Zhang Xilai
Wang Zhao as Zhao
Wei Xing as Wei Xing
Geng Lishu
Lin Jian
Derek Yee
Anita Yuen
Fang Ping
Alex Fong
Daniel Wu
Stephen Fung
Felix Chong
Alan Mak
Ann Hui

Release
The film opened the 2015 Shanghai International Film Festival on June 12, 2015 and was released in China on July 3, 2015.

Reception

Box office
The film earned  at the Chinese box office.

Critical response
Maggie Lee of Variety called the film an "empathetic but overlong ensembler."

Awards and nominations

References

External links

Chinese comedy-drama films
Hong Kong comedy-drama films
2015 comedy-drama films
Films directed by Derek Yee
2010s Hong Kong films